Vevang is a village in Hustadvika Municipality in Møre og Romsdal county, Norway. The village lies on the northern part of the Romsdal Peninsula, along the Lauvøyfjorden. The village is most-notable because it sits at the western end of the famous Atlantic Ocean Road.

References

Villages in Møre og Romsdal
Hustadvika (municipality)